In Greek mythology, Andreus may refer to two distinct individuals:

 Andreus, son of the river-god Peneus in Thessaly, from whom the district about Orchomenos in Boeotia was called Andreis. With Evippe, daughter of Leucon, Andreus had a son Eteocles, his successor.
 Andreus, in another passage Pausanias speaks of Andreus (it is, however, uncertain whether he means the same man as the former) as the person who first colonized the island of Andros. According to Diodorus Siculus, Andreus was one of the generals of Rhadamanthys, from whom he received the island afterwards called Andros as a present. Stephanus of Byzantium, Conon and Ovid call this first colonizer "Andrus" (son of Anius) and not Andreus.

Notes

References 

 Conon, Fifty Narrations, surviving as one-paragraph summaries in the Bibliotheca (Library) of Photius, Patriarch of Constantinople translated from the Greek by Brady Kiesling. Online version at the Topos Text Project.
 Diodorus Siculus, The Library of History translated by Charles Henry Oldfather. Twelve volumes. Loeb Classical Library. Cambridge, Massachusetts: Harvard University Press; London: William Heinemann, Ltd. 1989. Vol. 3. Books 4.59–8. Online version at Bill Thayer's Web Site
 Diodorus Siculus, Bibliotheca Historica. Vol 1-2. Immanel Bekker. Ludwig Dindorf. Friedrich Vogel. in aedibus B. G. Teubneri. Leipzig. 1888-1890. Greek text available at the Perseus Digital Library.
 Pausanias, Description of Greece with an English Translation by W.H.S. Jones, Litt.D., and H.A. Ormerod, M.A., in 4 Volumes. Cambridge, MA, Harvard University Press; London, William Heinemann Ltd. 1918. . Online version at the Perseus Digital Library
 Pausanias, Graeciae Descriptio. 3 vols. Leipzig, Teubner. 1903.  Greek text available at the Perseus Digital Library.
 Publius Ovidius Naso, Metamorphoses translated by Brookes More (1859-1942). Boston, Cornhill Publishing Co. 1922. Online version at the Perseus Digital Library.
 Publius Ovidius Naso, Metamorphoses. Hugo Magnus. Gotha (Germany). Friedr. Andr. Perthes. 1892. Latin text available at the Perseus Digital Library.

Kings in Greek mythology
Children of Peneus
Minyan characters in Greek mythology
Cretan characters in Greek mythology